Soerip (Perfected Spelling: Surip; 22 October 1921 – 7 May 1992) was an Indonesian singer and film actress.

Biography
Soerip was born in Banyuwangi, East Java, Dutch East Indies, on 22 October 1921. She only completed two years of elementary school before she dropped out. She later became a kroncong singer, often billed as Miss Soerip. Owing to her habit of batting her eyelashes while singing, she was also nicknamed "Si Mata Roda".

In 1940 Soerip made her feature film debut in Zoebaida, directed by Njoo Cheong Seng for Oriental Film. This was followed in 1941 by Panggilan Darah, in which Soerip was cast with Dhalia as orphaned sisters who try to make a living in the colonial capital of Batavia (now Jakarta). When the company folded, unable to recoup its expenses, Soerip migrated to Majestic Film. She completed three productions for the company: Air Mata Iboe, Djantoeng Hati, and Pantjawarna.

After the Japanese occupation of the Indies in March 1942, in which all but one domestic film studio was shut down, Soerip took a thirty-year hiatus from film, only returning to the industry in 1973 for Sopir Taxi. Owing to her age, she took the honorific Mbah (Grandmother), and was billed Mbah Soerip. During the following two decades she completed a further 20 films, including productions by Slamet Rahardjo, Teguh Karya, and Wim Umboh. A retrospective in Apa Siapa Film Indonesia particularly praises her performance in Rahardjo's Rembulan dan Matahari (1979).

In 1990 Soerip made her last film, Cintaku di Way Kambas, and a soap opera, Bayang-Bayang. That year she was recognised by the National Film Council for her dedication to acting. Soerip died on 7 May 1992 in Jakarta.

Filmography

Zoebaida (1940)
Pantjawarna (1941)
Panggilan Darah (1941)
Djantoeng Hati (1941)
Air Mata Iboe (1941)
Sopir Taksi (1973)
Fajar Menyingsing (1975)
Anak Emas (1976)
Akulah Vivian (Laki-laki Jadi Perempuan) (1977)
Koboi Cilik (1977)
Duo Kribo (1977)
November 1828 (1978)
Rembulan dan Matahari (1979)

Usia 18 (1980)
Seputih Hatinya Semerah Bibirnya (1980)
Perempuan dalam Pasungan (1980)
Bunga-bunga Perkawinan (1981)
Tirai Malam Pengantin (1983)
Luka Hati Sang Bidadari (1983)
Telaga Air Mata (1986)
Beri Aku Waktu (1986)
Di Balik Dinding Kelabu (1986)
Aku Benci Kamu (1987)
Sesaat dalam Pelukan (1989)
Dua dari Tiga Laki-laki (2 dari 3 Laki-laki) (1989)
Cintaku di Way Kambas (1990)
Sejak Cinta Diciptakan (1990)

References

Works cited

 

 
 
 

1921 births
1992 deaths
People from Banyuwangi Regency
Actresses of the Dutch East Indies
20th-century Indonesian women singers
20th-century Indonesian actresses